Absalón Castellanos Domínguez (2 October 1923 – 10 March 2017) was a Mexican politician. He was Commandant of the Heroic Military Academy from 1976 to 1980 and served as Governor of Chiapas from 1982 to 1988.

References

1923 births
2017 deaths
Institutional Revolutionary Party politicians
Governors of Chiapas
People from Comitán
20th-century Mexican politicians
Politicians from Chiapas